The women's high jump event at the 2020 Summer Olympics took place on 5 and 7 August 2021 at the Japan National Stadium. Even though 32 athletes qualified through the qualification system for the Games, only 31 took part in the competition. This was the 22nd appearance of the event, having appeared at every Olympics since women's athletics was introduced in 1928.

Qualification

A National Olympic Committee (NOC) could enter up to three qualified athletes in the women's high jump event if all athletes meet the entry standard or qualify by ranking during the qualifying period; this limit of three has been in place since the 1930 Olympic Congress. The qualifying standard was 1.96 metres. This standard was "set for the sole purpose of qualifying athletes with exceptional performances unable to qualify through the IAAF World Rankings pathway." The world rankings, based on the average of the best five results for the athlete over the qualifying period and weighted by the importance of the meet, was then used to qualify athletes until the cap of 32 was reached.

The qualifying period was originally from 1 May 2019 to 29 June 2020. Due to the COVID-19 pandemic, the period was suspended from 6 April 2020 to 30 November 2020, with the end date extended to 29 June 2021; athletes who had met the qualifying standard during the suspension time were still qualified, but those using world rankings would not be able to count performances during that time. The qualifying height standards could be obtained in various meets during the given period that had the approval of World Athletics. Both outdoor and indoor meets were eligible. The most recent Area Championships could be counted in the ranking, even if they did not take place during the qualifying period.

NOCs could also use their universality place — each NOC can enter one female athlete regardless of marks if they had no female athletes meeting the entry standard for an athletics event — in the high jump.

Competition format
The Tokyo 2020 competition continued to use the two-round format introduced in 1912. There are two distinct rounds of jumping with results cleared between rounds. Jumpers are eliminated if they have three consecutive failures, whether at a single height or between multiple heights if they attempt to advance before clearing a height.

The qualifying round has the bar set at various heights up to the qualifying standard, which in Tokyo 2020 was set at 1.95 metres. All jumpers clearing that standard advance to the final. A minimum of 12 jumpers advance; if fewer than 12 achieve the qualifying standard, the top 12 (including ties after use of the countback rules) advance.

The final has jumps starting typically just below the qualifying standard and increasing gradually. The final continues until all jumpers are eliminated.

Summary
For the previous five years, Mariya Lasitskene, previously known as Mariya Kuchina, had been the best high jumper in the world. She is from Russia, home of the Russian doping scandal. There are no reports of her personal involvement in the Russian doping program, but the scandal has resulted in her competing under three flags: Russia, Authorised Neutral Athletes, and ROC as well as under her married and maiden names. She has won three World Championships, but was barred from competing at the 2016 Olympics as part of a ban of Russia in athletics by the IAAF. 36 year old Ruth Beitia won in her absence. Beitia retired in 2017. Bronze medalist Blanka Vlašić also retired earlier in the season. Mirela Demireva was the only returning medalist in this field. 2019 World Championship silver medalist Yaroslava Mahuchikh, still a teenager, held the leading marks of 2021, 2.06m indoors and 2.03m outdoors. Next on both lists was World Championship bronze medalist Vashti Cunningham.

During qualifications at the 2020 Olympics, 14 women made 1.95m to automatically qualify for the final. In the final, all but two made 1.93m, and 9 were over 1.96m. Iryna Herashchenko and Eleanor Patterson had perfect rounds going. Lasitskene only made 1.96m on her last attempt. Nicola McDermott, the newest member of the 2 metres club, was the only jumper to clear 1.98m on her first attempt, putting her in the gold medal seat. Herashchenko took over silver position, making it on her second attempt, along with the still struggling Lasitskene. Mahuchikh made it on her last attempt to reduce the field to four. At 2 metres, McDermott, vocally encouraginging herself to "come on" before each jump, kept her hand on gold with a second first attempt clearance. Lasitskene and Mahuchikh made it on their second attempts to stand in a virtual tie for silver. When Herashchenko missed her third attempt, the medalists were set. The bar moved to 2.02m. After McDermott missed, Lasitskene cleared on her first attempt. Suddenly she was in gold position. Mahuchikh missed, then McDermott got over. Her clearance was a personal best, Australian national record, and Oceanic continental record. Having nothing to gain by clearing, Mahuchikh passed her remaining two attempts to 2.04m. All three missed their first attempt, and McDermott had a very narrow miss on her second. When Lasitskene cleared on her second attempt, it was a virtual nail in the coffin for the others. Mahuchikh took her final, all or nothing attempt to try to get silver, but she failed which secured bronze. McDermott could not get over on her final attempt and won silver. Lasitskene celebrated before the world photographic corps, holding a flag of her Olympic Committee.

Records
Prior to this competition, the existing world, Olympic, and area records were as follows.

The following new Area (continental) records were set during this competition:

The following national records were set during this competition:

Schedule
All times are Japan Standard Time (UTC+9)

The women's high jump took place over two separate days.

Results

Qualification
Qualification rule: Qualifying performance 1.95 (Q) or at least 12 best performers (q) advance to the final.

Final

References

Women's high jump
2020
Women's events at the 2020 Summer Olympics
Olympics